Konireddy Vijayamma is an Indian politician.

Vijayamma was elected from the legislative assembly constituency on behalf of the TDP in 2001 by a margin of 19,368 votes.

References

External links 

 List of candidates contesting the National Elections Commission of India.
 K. Vijayamma's official page on Facebook.

Living people
Year of birth missing (living people)
Telugu Desam Party politicians
Women members of the Andhra Pradesh Legislative Assembly
Andhra Pradesh MLAs 1999–2004
20th-century Indian women
20th-century Indian people